The Tasmanian Times was a newspaper published in Hobart, Tasmania, Australia. It was formerly known as the Evening Mail.

History
The newspaper was published from 1867 to 1870 by Donald Macmillan. It was published tri-weekly on Tuesday, Thursday and Saturday mornings. It was a single sheet of double demy. It cost 3 shillings for a quarter year or one penny per issue.

Digitisation 
The newspaper has been digitised and is available on Trove.

References

External links

Newspapers in Hobart, Tasmania
Defunct newspapers published in Tasmania